Sékou Bamba de Karamoko  (25 February 1970 in Odienné – 19 April 2008 in Abidjan) was an Ivorian professional footballer who played as a midfielder for several clubs in Africa and Europe.

Club career
Bamba played for Africa Sports National, ASEC Mimosas and Stade d'Abidjan in Ivory Coast. He had a brief spell with Antalyaspor in the Turkish Super Lig.

Bamba was part of ASEC's squad that were finalists at the African Cup of Champions Clubs 1995.

International career
Bamba played for the full Ivory Coast national football team, including appearing at the 1987 All-Africa Games and in qualifying matches for the 1990 FIFA World Cup. He was selected to play at the 1992 African Cup of Nations in Senegal, but refused to join the team.

Death
Bamba died at the age of 38. He left behind one son and two daughters.

References

External links
 

1970 births
2008 deaths
Ivorian footballers
Ivory Coast international footballers
Africa Sports d'Abidjan players
ASEC Mimosas players
Ivorian expatriate sportspeople in Turkey
Antalyaspor footballers
Expatriate footballers in Turkey
AS Denguélé players
People from Odienné
Association football forwards